Cucullia macara is a moth of the family Noctuidae first described by Hans Rebel in 1948. It has been recorded from North Africa the Levant and the Arabian Peninsula.

Adults are on wing from December to February. There is one generation per year.

External links

Cucullia
Moths described in 1948
Moths of the Middle East